Will Tupou (born 20 July 1990) is a New Zealand rugby union footballer who plays for the  in the Super Rugby competition. He previously played rugby league for the North Queensland Cowboys in the NRL. He represents  at international level, having satisfied residency requirements.

Background
Tupou was born in Auckland, New Zealand.

Early days
A Brisbane Souths junior, Tupou began his career with the Brisbane Broncos in the Toyota Cup before switching to the North Queensland Cowboys for the 2010 NRL season. After playing three strong performances in the Toyota Cup. He attended Brisbane State High School during his senior years.

Career
In round 4 of the National Rugby League 2010 he made his debut for the North Queensland Cowboys. On 24 July 2010 he scored a magnificent try to win the cowboys game over the Newcastle Knights in extra time.

Tupou joined the Western Force for the Super Rugby 2012 season.

References

External links
 

1990 births
Living people
Australian rugby league players
Australian rugby union players
Australian sportspeople of Tongan descent
Coca-Cola Red Sparks players
Expatriate rugby union players in Japan
Japan international rugby union players
New Zealand emigrants to Australia
North Queensland Cowboys players
People educated at Brisbane State High School
Rugby league centres
Rugby league players from Auckland
Rugby league wingers
Rugby union centres
Rugby union players from Auckland
Souths Logan Magpies players
Sunwolves players
Toyota Verblitz players
Western Force players